Senja Rutebil AS is a bus company based on the island of Senja and in Finnsnes in Troms og Finnmark, Norway. Founded in 1935 the company operates 36 buses on contract with Troms county municipality with 44 employees.

References

External links
 2009 Schedule

Bus companies of Troms og Finnmark
Senja